Andre Agassi was the defending champion but lost in the semifinals to Mardy Fish.

Andy Roddick won in the final 7–6(15–13), 6–4 against Fish.

Seeds
A champion seed is indicated in bold text while text in italics indicates the round in which that seed was eliminated.

  Andy Roddick (champion)
  Andre Agassi (semifinals)
  Mardy Fish (final)
  Taylor Dent (second round)
  Robby Ginepri (second round)
  Vince Spadea (second round)
  James Blake (second round)
  Wayne Ferreira (first round)

Draw

References
 2004 Siebel Open Draw

SAP Open
2004 ATP Tour